Northmen or Norsemen are the group of people as a whole who speak one of the North Germanic languages as their native language.

Northmen may also refer to:

 Northmen (Middle-earth), a fictional people from J. R. R. Tolkien's Middle-earth
 Northmen (Dungeons & Dragons), a fictional people from Dungeons & Dragons
 Northmen: A Viking Saga, a 2014 film
 Quebec Nordiques, the English translation of Nordiques is Northmen

See also 

 
 Northman (disambiguation)
 Norseman (disambiguation)